The National Socialist Party of America (NSPA) was a Chicago-based organization founded in 1970 by Frank Collin shortly after he left the National Socialist White People's Party. The NSWPP had been the American Nazi Party until shortly after the assassination of its leader George Lincoln Rockwell in 1967. Collin, a follower of Rockwell, developed differences with his successor Matt Koehl.

The party's headquarters was in Chicago's Marquette Park, and its main activity in the early 1970s was organizing loud demonstrations against black people  moving into previously all-white neighborhoods. The marches and community reaction led the city of Chicago to ban all demonstrations in Marquette Park unless they paid an insurance fee of $250,000. While challenging the city's actions in the courts, the party decided to redirect its attention to Chicago's suburbs, which had no such restrictions.

Harold Covington succeeded Collin as leader of the NSPA in 1979, before dissolving the organization in 1981.

Skokie controversy
In 1977 Collin announced the party's intention to march through the largely Jewish community of Skokie, Illinois, where one in six residents was a Holocaust survivor. A legal battle ensued when the village attempted to ban the event and the party. Represented by a Jewish ACLU lawyer in court, they won the right to march on First Amendment grounds in National Socialist Party v. Village of Skokie, a lawsuit carried all the way to the U.S. Supreme Court, though it failed to carry through its intention (at the last minute, Chicago relented and they marched there instead).

See also
Neo-Nazi groups in the Americas
National Socialist Party of America v. Village of Skokie
Marquette Park rallies

References

External links

Neo-Nazi political parties in the United States
History of Chicago
Defunct far-right political parties in the United States
Political parties established in 1970
1970 establishments in Illinois
1979 disestablishments in Illinois
Political parties disestablished in 1979
Antisemitism in the United States
Anti-communist organizations in the United States